The women's discus throw throwing event at the 1960 Olympic Games took place on September 3 & September 5.

Results
Top 12 throwers and ties plus all throwers reaching 47.00 metres advanced to the finals. All distances are listed in metres.

Qualifying

Final

Key: OR = Olympic record; NM = no mark

References

M
Discus throw at the Olympics
1960 in women's athletics
Women's events at the 1960 Summer Olympics